Mee or MEE may refer to:
 Mee (surname), surname list
 Maré Airport, via IATA code, airport in Maré, New Caledonia
 Mee (crater), a lunar impact crater
 MEE (psychedelic), organic compound, 2-methoxy-4,5-diethoxyamphetamine
 Mee (tribe), ethnic group from Papua, Indonesia
 Mee language, Trans–New Guinea language of Indonesia
 Middle East Eye, news outlet covering the Middle East
 Multistate Essay Examination, a test consisting of essay questions largely concerning common law
 Massey Energy, a former coal extractor in the United States
 Mee, a term for Chinese noodles commonly used in Southeast Asia
 Migration enhanced epitaxy, a refined molecular-beam epitaxy technique
 Multi Effect Evaporator
Ministry of Ecology and Environment

See also 
 Me (disambiguation)
 Mée (disambiguation)
 Mees (disambiguation)